Sam Nujoma Stadium (also called the Sam Nujoma Soccer Stadium or SNSS) is a football (soccer) stadium in Katutura, Windhoek, Namibia. The stadium holds 10,300 and was finished in 2005. It is named after the former Namibian president Sam Nujoma.

 the stadium is not in use due to safety concerns from "structural defects". The Confederation of African Football (CAF) has decommissioned the stadium in 2021 for it being sub-standard, and no other Namibian stadium meets CAF's requirements. As a result, international games of the Namibia national football team will have to be played abroad.

See also
 Independence Stadium (Namibia), the other large football stadium in Windhoek

References 

Football venues in Namibia
Buildings and structures in Windhoek
Sport in Windhoek
Sports venues completed in 2005